A Place in the Country is a studio album by American country singer-songwriter Bill Anderson. It was released in 1986 and was produced by Mike Johnson. The album marked Anderson's 33rd studio recording to be issued during his career. It was also his third independent studio album to be released. It also included three singles that were released and became charting singles on the Billboard country survey.

Background and content
A Place in the Country was Anderson's third studio album released on an independent recording label. During his career, he mostly was working under Decca/MCA Records, but left the label in 1981 following the end of his contract. By being able to independently-release music, Anderson could choose his own producer. Mike Johnson (bandleader of his band The Po' Folks) produced the project, his second time doing so. Anderson and Johnson recorded the album with The Po' Folks at three separate studio locations: The Reflectionist, Swanee Stadium and Southern Tracks studios. The album consisted of 11 tracks in its original release. In a later edition issued in the United Kingdom, 12 tracks were included. The album included two tracks that were written by Anderson himself. Other tracks had been written by other songwriters, notably Shel Silverstein and Paul Overstreet. The project also included songs first recorded by other artists. The track, "Once More", was a cover of the original by Roy Acuff. Silverstein's "The Unicorn" was a cover of the original 1968 version. Anderson had previously recorded a different version for an earlier album as well.

Release and chart performance
A Place in the Country was released in 1986 on Po' Folks Records, a label founded by Anderson. It was his first release for the label and his 33rd studio album overall. Original versions of the album were issued as vinyl LPs. The record did not reach the Billboard album charts, but did include three charting singles that became minor hits. The first single, "Your Eyes", was released in April 1984 and peaked at number 76 on the Billboard Hot Country Singles & Tracks chart. The album's second charting single was "Sheet Music". Released in December 1986, the single only reached number 80 in January 1987. The song was included on the second edition of the album. "No Ordinary Memory" was the album's final single and was released in August 1987. It reached number 78 on the country singles survey that same year. The United Kingdom version of the album included the 1984, "We May Never Pass This Way Again", which did not chart.

Track listing

Original version

UK version

Personnel
All credits are adapted from the liner notes of A Place in the Country.

Musical personnel
 Bill Anderson – lead vocals
 David Gould – harmonica
 Dirk Johnson – keyboards
 Mike Johnson – steel guitar, dobro
 Les Singer – guitar
 Mike Streeter – drums
 Bruce Watkins – guitar, banjo, fiddle, mandolin

Technical personnel
 Frank Evans – engineering
 Doug Johnson – engineering
 Mike Johnson – producer
 Gene Rice – engineering
 Kris Wilkinson – arrangement
 Bergen White – arrangement

Release history

References

1986 albums
Bill Anderson (singer) albums